André Kiser (born 10 April 1958) is a Swiss bobsledder. He competed in the two man and the four man events at the 1988 Winter Olympics. He also won three medals at the FIBT World Championships with two golds (Four-man: 1986, 1987) and one silver (Two-man: 1987).

References

External links
 Bobsleigh two-man world championship medalists since 1931
 Bobsleigh four-man world championship medalists since 1930

1958 births
Living people
Swiss male bobsledders
Olympic bobsledders of Switzerland
Bobsledders at the 1988 Winter Olympics
Place of birth missing (living people)
20th-century Swiss people